Swimming at the 2011 European Youth Summer Olympic Festival was held from 25 to 29 July 2011. The competitions took place at the Mehmet Akif Ersoy Indoor Swimming Pool in Trabzon, Turkey. Boys born 1995/1996 and girls born 1997/1998 participated in the following 31 disciplines.

Competition schedule

Day 1

Day 2

Day 3

Day 4

Medal summary

Medal table

Medal events

Boys' events

Girls' events

Mixed events

References

Swimming
European Youth Summer Olympic Festival
2011
Swimming competitions in Turkey